Bizarra is a fictional character appearing in American comic books published by DC Comics. Bizarra first appeared in DC Comics Presents #71 (July 1984), in a story written by E. Nelson Bridwell with art by Curt Swan. The character is a distorted version of the superhero Wonder Woman, based on the Superman villain Bizarro. She is a very simple-minded being, has reversed character traits, believes women are inferior to men, and speaks in reverse of what her true meaning is.

Fictional character biography

Pre-Crisis
Bizarro-Wonder Woman is first shown as a member of the Bizarro Justice League team of social misfit heroes that inhabit Bizarro World. Their home base is an abandoned submarine at the bottom of the sea. The team consists of Bizarro, Bizarro Wonder Woman, Bizarro Yellow Lantern, Bizarro Aquaman, and Bizarro Hawkman. Batzarro had left the team to form the superhero group "The Insiders", a Bizarro version of the Outsiders team.

In the story, Bizarro is bored being able to defeat his fellow Justice League members so he creates a Bizarro version of the villain Amazo. Amazo steals the powers of the Justice League, including Wonder Woman, and helpfully gives them to ordinary citizens of Bizarro World. After realizing the folly of his actions, Bizarro convinces Bizarro Amazo to return the powers to the proper persons.

Post-Crisis
In 1985, DC Comics introduced a storyline titled Crisis on Infinite Earths. That company-wide story arc erased the established history of almost all DC Comic's characters. Bizarra was then re-introduced as part of an all new Bizarro Justice League team (which included Bizarro, Batzarro, Bizarro Flash, Bizarro Hawkgirl, and Bizarro Yellow Lantern). They live on the cube-shaped planet Htrae which is populated entirely with Bizarro-type humans. At one point, Bizarro Hawkgirl tied up Bizarra (in that story referred to as "Wonder Woman") with her own lasso. It was explained that Bizarra's lasso had the ability to force anyone tied by it to tell only lies. Bizarra seemed to be romantically interested in Bizarro but the feeling was not shared as Bizarro was in love with his world's version of Lois Lane only. During the storyline, it was shown that due to exposure to Htrae's blue sun, Bizarro gained the ability to create new Bizarro life-forms. Whether Bizarra was created by Bizarro or was a pre-existing character is unclear.

Bizarra is later shown to be working for the villain Monarch. She, along with several other variant super-heroes, torture Tracer mercilessly. Bizarra ends the battle by hanging Tracer with her lasso from a fire escape by his neck.

Abilities

Powers and skills
Bizarra is depicted as having all the abilities of Wonder Woman, although in some incarnations several of these traits have been reversed, such as:
 "Lasso of Lies", a lasso that forces anyone tied by it to lie, instead of Lasso of Truth.

Other versions

All-Star Superman
In 2005, DC Comics released the All-Star line of comics. This line is not in continuity with the other comic book titles released through DC Comics so its storylines have no impact on Wonder Woman's generally established comic book history. In the title All-Star Superman, a Bizarro Wonder Woman is introduced. Generally she is a 4- to 5-foot-tall statue carried around by Bizarro on various Bizarro Justice League missions. Bizarro explains that Bizarro Wonder Woman started out as a beautiful baby who turned into an ugly cheap clay statue. Thus she has the opposite life of the traditional Wonder Woman who started out as a clay statue of a child who was transformed into a flesh and blood woman. Despite being an inanimate statue, Bizarro insists that Bizarro Wonder Woman is a good team player.

In other media

Television 
 Bizarra appears in The Super Powers Team: Galactic Guardians episode "The Bizarro Super Powers Team", voiced by B.J. Ward, who also voiced Wonder Woman. In the episode, Bizarro decides that his world of Bizarros needs more heroes than just Bizarro Supermen. He takes a duplicator ray to Earth and makes Bizarro duplicates of Wonder Woman (referred to as Bizarro Wonder Woman), Firestorm and Cyborg. Planning on taking them back to protect Bizarro World, Mister Mxyzptlk convinces Bizarro to train his new friends on Earth, which causes havoc for the real Super Powers Team.

Film 
 Bizarra appears in Lego DC Comics Super Heroes: Justice League vs. Bizarro League, voiced by Kari Wahlgren. In it, she, Batzarro, Greenzarro, and Cyzarro are created by Bizarro firing a duplicating ray at Batman, Wonder Woman, Green Lantern, and Cyborg.

Video games 
 Bizarra appears in Lego Batman 3: Beyond Gotham. In the Bizarro World DLC map, Bizarra is among the Bizarro Justice League members that defends Bizarro World from Darkseid's forces.

References

Clone characters in comics
Comics characters introduced in 1984
DC Comics characters who can move at superhuman speeds
DC Comics characters with accelerated healing
DC Comics characters with superhuman strength
DC Comics female supervillains
DC Comics female superheroes
DC Comics demons
DC Comics Amazons
Fictional rope fighters
Wonder Woman characters